Dielmann is a surname. Notable people with the surname include:

Jakob Fürchtegott Dielmann (1809–1885), German illustrator and painter
Leo M. J. Dielmann (1881–1969), American architect

See also
Dielman (disambiguation)